B.Sivakumar is an Indian director of several Tamil short films.

Career
He entered the film industry as an assistant director, and has worked with Ravichandran in Kannedhirey Thondrinal, Kanave Kalaiyadhe and Janaki Viswanathan in Kutty. He has also made commercial advertisements. His debut film as a director, Aayeeshaa, won best short film at London in 2001 by Cine Sangam, and second best short film at the 7th Mumbai International Film Festival 2002. It was screened at the International Children Film Festival 2001 held in Hyderabad, and the Indian Panorama in 2002.

His second short film in 2002, Urumattram won the National Film Award for Best Non-Feature Environment/Conservation/Preservation Film..

He received two awards at the 20th International Children’s Film Festival India (ICFFI), winning the Best Short Films and Special Jury Prizes for the short, Stamp Album, based on a story by Sundara Ramaswamy.

He is currently working as a Co-Director with Veteran playback Singer, Actor and Producer ''SPB Charan for an upcoming web series "ADHIGARAM" (Under Production)

Filmography

References 

1974 births
Living people
Film directors from Tamil Nadu
Tamil film directors
Directors who won the Best Film on Environment Conservation/Preservation National Film Award